Russell M. Kulsrud (born 10 April 1928 in Lindsborg, Kansas) is an American physicist who specializes in plasma physics and astrophysics.

Kulsrud studied at the University of Maryland where he received his bachelor's degree in 1949, and then at the University of Chicago, where he completed his master's degree in 1952 and received his doctorate from Subrahmanyan Chandrasekhar in 1954 (Effect of Magnetic Fields on Generation of Noise by Isotropic Turbulence). From 1954, he was in the Matterhorn Nuclear Fusion Project at Princeton University and subsequently at the Princeton Plasma Physics Laboratory. In 1964, he became head of the theoretical department. In 1966, he and his wife Helene Kulsrud moved to Yale University where he became a professor. He returned to Princeton University as Professor of Astrophysical Sciences in 1967, where he remained until he retired in 2004.

In 1993, he received the James Clerk Maxwell Prize for Plasma Physics for "his pioneering contributions to basic plasma theory, to the physics of magnetically confined plasmas, and to plasma astrophysics.  His important work en-compasses plasma equilibria and stability, adiabatic invariance, ballooning modes, runaway electrons, colliding beams, spin-polarized plasmas, and cosmic-ray instabilities".

Books 
 Plasma Physics for Astrophysics. Princeton University Press, Princeton, N.J. 2004, .

References 

20th-century American physicists
1928 births
People from Lindsborg, Kansas
Living people
American plasma physicists
University System of Maryland alumni
University of Chicago alumni